Skiti is a village in the municipality of Agia, in the Larissa regional unit in Greece.
The name of this village refers to the place that the monks lived alone away from public view. According to historic research, the ancient Melivoia was situated close to Polydendri or Skiti. The ancient Melivoia was the metropolis of Philoctetes and very popular for the deep red (Purpura Meliboiae) dying of drapery. The ancient city is placed in the south firth of the Bourboulithra stream. In the northwest of Skiti there are the ruins of a fort which most probably belonged to the Byzantine city of Kentavroupoli. About 1 kilometer Northwest of Skiti, (on the new road that leads from Larissa to Agiokampos) is the monastery of mount Kelli, called Sts. Anargiroi. The monastery includes two "chambers" for the monks to leave in. The mural was created between 12th and 16th century.

References
Σκήτη Λάρισας

External links
Skiti Site
Guide for beaches of Larissa

Populated places in Larissa (regional unit)